The 56 Division is a division of the Sri Lanka Army. Established on 17 October 1997, the division is currently based in Kokeliya in the Northern Province. The division is a part of Security Forces Headquarters – Wanni and has two brigades and six battalions. Brigadier D. A. R. Ranawaka has been commander of the division since 6 August 2012.

Organisation
The division is currently organised as follows:
 561 Brigade
 16th Battalion, Sri Lanka Sinha Regiment
 19th Volunteer Battalion, Gajaba Regiment (based in Kanakarayankulam, Northern Province)
 17th Volunteer Battalion, Vijayabahu Infantry Regiment
 562 Brigade
 21st Battalion, Sri Lanka Sinha Regiment
 11th Battalion, Sri Lanka National Guard

References

1997 establishments in Sri Lanka
Military units and formations established in 1997
Organisations based in Northern Province, Sri Lanka
Sri Lanka Army divisions